Bovadzor (formerly, Maksim Gorkiy, Maksim Gorki, and Maksim Gor’kiy; originally, Aleksandrovka) is a town in the Lori Province of Armenia. During the Soviet era, the town was named for the Soviet writer, Maxim Gorkiy.

References 
 (as Maksim Gorkiy)

Populated places in Lori Province